Ebonics may refer to:
African-American Vernacular English, a distinctive lect, or variety, of English spoken by African Americans, sometimes called Ebonics
Ebonics (word), originally referring to the language of the descendants of enslaved African people, but later coming to mean African-American Vernacular English
Ebonics: The True Language of Black Folks, a 1975 book by social scientist Robert Williams
"Ebonics", a song by rapper Big L from the album The Big Picture